There are 121 scheduled monuments in the county of Buckinghamshire, in England. These protected sites date from the Neolithic period and include barrows, moated sites, ruined abbeys, Iron Age hillforts, a medieval hospital and a holy well.
In the United Kingdom, the scheduling of monuments was first initiated to insure the preservation of "nationally important" archaeological sites or historic buildings. The protection given to scheduled monuments is given under the Ancient Monuments and Archaeological Areas Act 1979

Notable scheduled monuments in Buckinghamshire

See also
Grade I listed buildings in Buckinghamshire
List of scheduled monuments in the United Kingdom

References

Scheduled monuments in Buckinghamshire